This is list of archives in Venezuela.

Archives in Venezuela 

Archivo General de la Nación de Venezuela
Archivo General del Estado de Lara
Archivo General del Estado de Mérida
Archivo General del Estado de Táchira
Archivo Histórico del Estado Trujillo

See also 

 List of archives
 List of libraries in Venezuela
 List of museums in Venezuela
 Culture of Venezuela
 Portal de Archivos Españoles (federated search of archives in Spain)

External links 
 http://www.agn.gob.ve
 General Archives database (all)

 
Venezuela
Archives
Archives